Beauty (formerly Himlerville) is an unincorporated community in Martin County, Kentucky, United States. During the early 1920s the community was the home of the Himler Coal Company, a cooperative mining venture conducted by a group of Hungarian immigrants.

History

Origins
In the mountains of Eastern Kentucky once existed the unique, Hungarian community of Himlerville. Martin Himler emigrated from Hungary to New York and, eventually, to Martin County and established the Himler Coal Company and soon after the town of Himlerville. He contacted other Hungarians to share in his dream of an all Hungarian community nestled deep in the Appalachian Mountains.

Development
Himlerville became a lively community of industrious Hungarian immigrants. More than 200 homes were built, as well as, many businesses to supply the coal mine and the town's residents. A railroad was constructed, along with a bridge over the Tug River to transport supplies, lumber and coal in and out of Himlerville. A bank was established, as well as schools, churches, and a town hall for community gatherings.

Himlerville had its own water reservoir and power station that gave electricity thus life to the town; it even had its own newspaper which was printed in both English and Hungarian. During the 1920s, Himlerville was a very progressive town with many thriving businesses to accommodate its unique population.

As Coal Age described, "Stock in the company is sold only to Hungarians, native or naturalized. One of the bylaws of the company provides, however, that no stockholder may seek employment with the company until he has undertaken naturalization as an American Citizen. According to Martin Himler, president of the company, no stockholder in the company has yet arrived in America without a firm resolution to become an American citizen as promptly as the laws will permit."

Demise

In 1928, Himlerville Coal Company went bankrupt due to a devastating flood and Martin Himler left, leaving behind a mansion on the hill and his dream of an all Hungarian community. Most of the residents soon followed, never to return. Later on, the name of the town was changed to Beauty and very little remains of this once exclusive Hungarian community in the mountains of Eastern Kentucky.

The Martin Himler House was listed on the National Register of Historic Places in 1991.

Notable residents
Beauty was the childhood home of country singer Angaleena Presley.

See also
 Ajax (formerly Himler), West Virginia
 Martin Himler House

Footnotes

Further reading

 Eugene S. Bagger, "Himler of Himlerville," Survey Graphic, vol. 48, no. 5 (April 29, 1922), pp. 146–150, 187.
 Doug Cantrell, "Himlerville: Hungarian Cooperative Mining in Kentucky," Filson Club History Quarterly, vol. 66, no. 4 (October 1992), pp. 513–542.
 Doug Cantrell, "Immigrants and Community in Harlan County, 1910–1930," Register of the Kentucky Historical Society, vol. 86, no. 2 (Spring 1988), pp. 119–141. In JSTOR
 J.R. Hayworth, "Hungarians Successfully Conduct Cooperative Mine in Kentucky, Having Two Million Dollars Invested," Coal Age [New York], vol. 20, no. 11 (September 15, 1921), pp. 412–414.
 Martin County Historical and Genealogical Society, A Pictorial History of Martin County, Kentucky. Paducah, KY: Turner Publishing Company, 2001.
 Tom Wallace, "Miners Will Run Own Mine: Experiment of Hungarians at Warfield, KY, Promoted by Gotham Editor," Louisville Courier-Journal, October 18, 1920, pp. 1, 7.
 Margaret Ripley Wolfe, "The Towns of King Coal," Register of the Kentucky Historical Society, vol. 97, no. 2 (Spring 1999), pp. 189–201. In JSTOR

External links
 "Our Town: Himlerville," Kentucky Educational Television, March 3, 2015. —Video.
 Doug Cantrell, "Himler, Himlerville, and a Historian's Quest," Appalachian History, www.appalachianhistory.net/ September 17, 2015.
 Cathy Cassady Corbin, "Saving the Himler House," Appalachian History, www.appalachianhistory.net/ November 10, 2014.

Coal towns in Kentucky
Unincorporated communities in Martin County, Kentucky
Unincorporated communities in Kentucky